Affinity Living Riverview is a  tall, 35-storey residential skyscraper in Salford, England. It is located on the north bank of the River Irwell, near to Manchester's key central business district of Spinningfields. The building was designed by Denton Corker Marshall, the architects behind the nearby Civil Justice Centre. As of 2023, it is the third-tallest building in Salford and the 12th-tallest building in Greater Manchester.

History

Planning
The original planning application was submitted to Salford City Council in February 2016 for 318 apartments. Planning approval was obtained in July 2016. In June 2020, an application for an additional 14 apartments was submitted to the council, bringing the total to 332 apartments. Planning approval was obtained in September 2020.

Construction
Construction of Affinity Living Riverview was started in 2017 by contractor Carillion, until its liquidation in January 2018. Work was stalled until replacement contractor Sir Robert McAlpine commenced work in September 2018 and the tower was completed in 2021.

Affinity Living Riverview is located next to Affinity Living Riverside, a 17-storey residential building with 190 apartments that was also completed by contractor Sir Robert McAlpine in December 2019.

Facilities
Affinity Living Riverview includes a co-working lounge, gym, coffee-lounge and social areas which are located on the ground and mezzanine floors.

See also
List of tallest buildings in the United Kingdom
List of tallest buildings and structures in Greater Manchester

References

Buildings and structures in Salford
2021 establishments in England
Residential skyscrapers in England
Apartment buildings in England
Residential buildings completed in 2021